Sudipto Balav is an Indian actor who is known for his negative roles. He is known for his works primarily in Malayalam, Hindi, and Bengali-language films.

Career 
In 1999, Sudipto Balav started acting in Kolkata and worked on several television shows. He also worked as a host for MTV Bakra before making his debut as an antagonist with the Malayalam film 2 Harihar Nagar (2009). He learned Malayalam to prepare for his role. He portrayed a ISI agent in Tere Bin Laden (2010). He worked on an English film titled Meridian Lines; however, the film remains unreleased. He has since starred in thirty films in various Indian languages and starred in the Hollywood film Extraction in the role of a henchman.

Filmography

References

External links 

Male actors in Malayalam cinema
Male actors in Hindi cinema
Male actors in Bengali cinema
Year of birth missing (living people)
Living people
Indian male film actors
21st-century Indian male actors